Muppet Beach Party is a music and comedy record released by The Jim Henson Company through BMG Kidz in 1993. The album consisted of the Muppets having an all-day beach party and performing popular songs, mostly from the 1960s. Similar to The Muppet Show albums from the late 1970s, the album divides song tracks with Muppet dialogue. It was released in CD and cassette form, with the latter including a poster with lyrics on the opposite side.

The album was the first full-length Muppet album to feature Steve Whitmire as Kermit the Frog's new voice after the death of Jim Henson.

Track listing

Personnel

 The Muppets – Primary Artist
 Steve Whitmire – Kermit the Frog and Rizzo the Rat
 Frank Oz – Miss Piggy, Fozzie Bear and Animal
 Kevin Clash – Clifford
 Dave Goelz – Gonzo the Great
 Jerry Nelson – Robin the Frog
 Walt Harrah – Vocals
 Angie Jaree – Vocals
 Bob Joyce – Vocals
 David Joyce – Vocals
 Tampa Lann – Vocals
 Myrna Matthews – Vocals
 Rockapella – Vocals
 Randy Crenshaw – Vocal Arrangement, Vocals
 Nick Brown – Guitar
 George Doering – Guitar
 Ken Wild – Bass
 Michael Bruno – Percussion

 Ralph Humphrey – Drums
 Bill Reichenbach Jr. – Horn Arrangements, Trombone
 Gary Grant – Trumpet
 Jerry Hey – Trumpet
 Dan Higgins – Saxophone
 Mike Lang – Keyboards
 Dan Stein – Associate Producer, Keyboards, Sound Design
 Michael K. Frith – Art Direction
 Theo Panagopoulos – Art Direction
 Brian Bonehead Kinkead – Assistant Engineer
 James McIlvery – Assistant Engineer
 Dave McNair – Engineer
 Michael Golub – Engineer
 Rob Seifert – Engineer
 Bill Straus – Engineer
 Dennis Sands – Engineer/Mixer
 Ric Wilson – Mastering

Other appearances
 1980: "Surfin' U.S.A." was performed by Kermit and his frog henchmen in episode 518 of The Muppet Show.
 1993: The Muppets' rendition of "Kokomo" was made into a music video. The video was included on Muppet Sing Alongs: It's Not Easy Being Green (1994) and aired on Nickelodeon.

References 

1993 albums
The Muppets albums